Bridalveil Falls is a seasonal waterfall located at Pictured Rocks National Lakeshore, Michigan. Directions: From H-58 from Munising go east  to Miners Castle Road, then  to the Castle. You can see this from afar from here. You can also see it from the Lake in a boat, or hiking on the Lakeshore Trail (Although only partial views from a distance can be seen from the trail itself. A dangerous view of the crest can be seen after a short hike from the trail.)

References

Waterfalls of Michigan
Landforms of Alger County, Michigan